was a Japanese diplomat.

Diplomatic career
Matsumoto served as Japanese Vice Minister of Foreign Affairs at the Cabinet of General Hideki Tōjō in 1942, and Japanese Ambassador to French Indochina from November 1944 to March 1945, shortly before the Japanese authorities took actual control of the area. On March 9, 1945, served French Governor-General Jean Decoux the ultimatum demanding the surrender of the French forces to the Japanese authorities. Returned himself to Vice Minister of Foreign Affairs at the Cabinet of Admiral Kantarō Suzuki in 1945, at the time of surrender. In this position, he advocated the acceptance of the Potsdam Declaration.

He was the first Japanese Ambassador to the United Kingdom following the reestablishing of diplomatic relations after the Second World War, serving in that position in 1952-1955. In 1955-1963, he was a member of House of Representatives of Japan. In 1956 took part in negotiations with the Soviet government on establishment of diplomatic relations. In 1967, he was given the Order of the Sacred Treasure.

Works
 Mosukuwa ni Kakeru Niji [Rainbow over Moscow—The Secret Record of Restoring Japan-Soviet Relations] (Asahi Shimbunsha, 1966) - diplomatic memoirs about talks with Moscow 1955-1956

References

Further reading
 Kimie Hara, "The Åland Settlement as a Resolution Model for Asia-Pacific Regional Conflicts? Considering the "Nitobe Settlement" for the "Northern Territories" Problem as a Case Study" in New Initiatives for Solving the Northern Territories Issue between Japan and Russia: An Inspiration from the Åland Islands Conference, Mariehamn/Åland, 18–20 August 2006 

1897 births
1987 deaths
Ambassadors of Japan to the United Kingdom
Grand Crosses with Star and Sash of the Order of Merit of the Federal Republic of Germany